Exmouth Island is one of six islands in the Norwegian Bay west of Ellesmere Island, Queen Elizabeth Islands in the Arctic Archipelago.

References 

Islands of the Queen Elizabeth Islands
Uninhabited islands of Qikiqtaaluk Region